East Sariwŏn station (or Tongsariwŏn station) is a railway station located in Sariwŏn, North Hwanghae province, North Korea. It is on located on the P'yŏngbu Line, which was formed from part of the Kyŏngŭi Line to accommodate the shift of the capital from Seoul to P'yŏngyang; though this line physically connects P'yŏngyang to Pusan via Dorasan, in operational reality it ends at Kaesŏng due to the Korean Demilitarized Zone.

Originally called Sinbongsan station, the station was opened by the Chosen Government Railway on 1 December 1926.

References

Railway stations in North Korea
Buildings and structures in North Hwanghae Province
Sariwon
Railway stations opened in 1926
1926 establishments in Korea